Elliot Minor was a English rock band from York, England. The band currently consists of lead vocalist and guitarist Alex Davies, vocalist and guitarist Ed Minton, drummer Dan Hetherton, bassist Ed Hetherton and keyboardist Ali Paul. The band had a string of Top 40 singles in the UK chart, including "Jessica", "The White One Is Evil", "Still Figuring Out" alongside their biggest hit "Parallel Worlds". In 2010, the band entered an indefinite hiatus which lasted until 2014 when they played some reunion shows and released a new single before returning to their hiatus.

History

Formation and early days: 2000–2006
Elliot Minor started as 'The Academy' with Alex Davies, Ed Minton and a mutual friend when they met at school when they were thirteen. Davies bumped into childhood friend Dan Hetherton and ended up inviting him along to a band practice to see if he was interested in joining their band. Dan Hetherton joined as the band's drummer, who then recruited his brother Ed to join the band on bass. Ali Paul was eventually invited to join the band on keyboards, completing the band's lineup.

Elliot Minor: 2006–2008
In 2006, Elliot Minor won a MySpace competition to support McFly for one show on their Greatest Hits tour with an audience of over 13,000 at Manchester. They signed to Repossession Records, an independent label run by their manager, Gary Ashley. Their first single, "Parallel Worlds", reached No. 31 on the UK Singles Chart; subsequent singles, "Jessica", "The White One Is Evil", and "Still Figuring Out", all reached the top 30. "Parallel Worlds" was reissued, followed by "Time After Time". In 2007 they headlined a new music festival in the south called Butserfest.

Elliot Minor signed a distribution deal with Warner Bros. Records and recorded their debut album in Santa Monica, California, with Jim Wirt, producer for Hoobastank, Jack's Mannequin, Something Corporate, Incubus and others, and it debuted on 14 April 2008. Many of the songs from the album were written during their school days. Upon release, the album managed to debut at No. 6 on the UK Albums Chart, and at No. 30 on the Irish Albums Chart.

That same year, Elliot Minor played at several large music festivals, including T in the Park, Reading and Leeds, and Download Festival. They made an appearance on Jo Whiley's Radio 1's Live Lounge – Volume 3, recording a cover of Take That's "Rule the World". Their song "Running Away" was featured on the BBC's coverage of the Beijing 2008 Summer Olympics.

Solaris and Solaris Acoustic: 2009–2010
Elliot Minor took a break from touring to write their second album, Solaris. In June 2009, the band announced that their distribution deal with Warner Bros. had come to an end, and that they had decided to part ways from the label and release Solaris on Repossession Records as an independent album.

Alex Davies drew from experiences and changes in his life over the years Elliot Minor had been formed until the present when writing the album. He says, "The majority of the songs are uplifting as I was being positive in a pretty tough year to work through and the others are more personal and intimate." They have described their first album as being a collection of singles, while their second is more of a proper album with a beginning, middle, and end. This album was also recorded with Jim Wirt.

"Solaris" was announced to be the first single from the band's second album; however, due to technical problems with the format of the single, it was not released on iTunes as planned on 10 August 2009. The band decided to go with "Electric High" as the first single instead. The tracks "Solaris" and "Discover (Why the Love Hurts)" were rerecorded before the album was released on 19 October 2009. The album, mixed by John Greatwood and Tom Lord-Alge, reached No. 9 in the UK Indie Chart. The album was released in Japan, along with exclusive bonus tracks, on 21 April 2010.

An alternate version of "Solaris" was featured on the Vancouver 2010 Winter Olympics BBC coverage. The band recorded a cover of Owl City's "Fireflies" for fun, posting it on their YouTube channel along with footage of their video blogs. The song was picked up by Kerrang! and gained popularity when the station aired an edited version of the video on Kerrang! TV. The song has also received radio airplay by Kerrang!.

On 28 August 2010, keyboardist Ali Paul announced that after completing tour commitments with Elliot Minor in September he would be leaving the band and would go on to study at York University reading Law. On 14 September 2011, Ali appeared on BBC One quiz show Pointless alongside his then girlfriend, getting to the final but leaving empty handed.

An hour long live special featuring the band playing live at the Relentless Garage in London on their April 2010 tour was shown on Kerrang! TV on 16 August. At the start of 2010, it was announced that an acoustic version of the album Solaris was to be recorded and released later that year. Solaris Acoustic, was released on 15 November 2010, along with a DVD of the Kerrang! live special.

Hiatus: 2010–present
In November 2010, drummer Dan Hetherton started working on a project with James Matthews, former singer of Go:Audio. They formed the band The Dead Famous with close friends Luke Bayliss and Satoshi, playing bass and guitar respectively. Satoshi was replaced in early 2011 by another close friend, Fred. A hiatus was rumoured but not officially announced until December 2011, when Dan Hetherton announced the hiatus on his Facebook page stating that he didn't want it but other members of the band wanted a break, he formed the Dead Famous to continue his passion of making music. Davies is working on production and his new band called 'Spirits' which was announced on his Twitter page. Ed Hetherton is now at University College London studying geophysics and Minton is at King's College London studying business management.

Reunion: 2014
As of 30 November 2013 the band started to post on their Facebook page, merely posting "2014" for the first few days, but building up with hints. Originally taken by fans as a reunion, the band announced on 7 December that they would play a one-off show at Camden Underworld 28 March 2014 supported by Maven, They Say Fall and Forever The Foundations. The band sold the show out in minutes and they added another show, and would go on to play another show later in 2014 to promote their new song "All My Life", a one-off single. The band then returned to their hiatus, continuing to be active on social media but with no chance of a reunion at present.

The Fever the Focus
In 2016, Alex Davies and Ed Minton came together for a one-off mini-project known as The Fever the Focus. They released an album, Fading Lights, after gaining funds through the crowd-funding website Pledge Music.

Musical background and style
The members of Elliot Minor are classically trained musicians and play a wide variety of instruments including violin, piano, clarinet, cello, double bass, saxophone, guitar and drums.

Their music is described as "pop/rock with a lot of classical harmonies", and is known for being rich in minor and dissonant chords. Many of their songs are characterised by their vocal harmonies. Their recorded songs are rich in complex string and choral arrangements, all written by Davies, which are difficult to replicate live without a full orchestra. However, the classical elements in their song "Jessica" have been replicated during performances on stage, with Davies using an electric violin.

Band members
Alex Davies – lead and backing vocals, lead guitars, 12-string acoustic guitar, keyboards, violin, oboe (2000–present)
Edward Minton – lead and backing vocals, lead and rhythm guitars, acoustic guitar (2000–present)
Edward Hetherton – bass guitars, cello, backing vocals (2005–present)
Dan Hetherton – drums, percussion, bongos, tambourine, backing vocals (2005–present)
Ali Paul – keyboards, synthesizer, piano, backing vocals (2006–2010, 2014)

Discography

 Elliot Minor (2008)
 Solaris (2009)

References

External links
 

Repossession Records artists
English rock music groups
Musicians from York
Musical groups established in 2006
Alumni of the University of York